Still is a compilation album by English rock band Joy Division, consisting of previously released and unreleased studio material and a live recording of Joy Division's last concert, performed at Birmingham University. It was released on 8 October 1981 by Factory Records.

Background 
Still was released after the death of the band's frontman Ian Curtis. It consists of previously unused or unavailable studio material and live recordings. The album includes the only live performance by the group of the song "Ceremony", which later became a New Order single. The recording abruptly begins just before the song's first chorus; like all surviving Joy Division recordings of "Ceremony", Curtis's vocals are barely audible, though in this instance the final chorus is unusually clear. Another song featured is a cover of the Velvet Underground's "Sister Ray", recorded at the Moonlight Club in London on 2 April 1980.

Release 
Originally planned for release in August, Still was eventually released on 8 October 1981. It reached No. 5 in the UK upon its release, and peaked at No. 3 in New Zealand in February 1982.

The CD version of the album was released in March 1990 and was the first edition to delete "Twenty Four Hours".

Still, along with Closer and Unknown Pleasures, was remastered and reissued on 17 September 2007. The remaster was packaged with a bonus disc of live recordings from the Town Hall, High Wycombe on 20 February 1980.

Reception 

Joshua Klein of Pitchfork called the album "a ragged, enigmatic coda; an uneven odds-and-ends collection of lost tracks that fills in some gaps in Joy Division's history and legacy". BBC Music called it "a partly frustrating compilation".

Track listing

Personnel 
 Technical

 Martin Hannett – production
 Chris Nagle – engineering
 Grafica Industria – sleeve artwork

Charts

Certifications

References

External links 

 

Joy Division compilation albums
Albums produced by Martin Hannett
1981 live albums
1981 compilation albums
Factory Records compilation albums
Factory Records live albums
Joy Division live albums